In mathematics, the Schoen–Yau conjecture is a disproved conjecture in hyperbolic geometry, named after the mathematicians Richard Schoen and Shing-Tung Yau.

It was inspired by a theorem of Erhard Heinz (1952). One method of disproof is the use of Scherk surfaces, as used by Harold Rosenberg and Pascal Collin (2006).

Setting and statement of the conjecture

Let  be the complex plane considered as a Riemannian manifold with its usual (flat) Riemannian metric. Let  denote the hyperbolic plane, i.e. the unit disc

endowed with the hyperbolic metric

E. Heinz proved in 1952 that there can exist no harmonic diffeomorphism

In light of this theorem, Schoen conjectured that there exists no harmonic diffeomorphism

(It is not clear how Yau's name became associated with the conjecture: in unpublished correspondence with Harold Rosenberg, both Schoen and Yau identify Schoen as having postulated the conjecture). The Schoen(-Yau) conjecture has since been disproved.

Comments

The emphasis is on the existence or non-existence of an harmonic diffeomorphism, and that this property is a "one-way" property. In more detail: suppose that we consider two Riemannian manifolds M and N (with their respective metrics), and write

if there exists a diffeomorphism from M onto N (in the usual terminology, M and N are diffeomorphic). Write

if there exists an harmonic diffeomorphism from M onto N. It is not difficult to show that  (being diffeomorphic) is an equivalence relation on the objects of the category of Riemannian manifolds. In particular,  is a symmetric relation:

It can be shown that the hyperbolic plane and (flat) complex plane are indeed diffeomorphic:

so the question is whether or not they are "harmonically diffeomorphic". However, as the truth of Heinz's theorem and the falsity of the Schoen–Yau conjecture demonstrate,  is not a symmetric relation:

Thus, being "harmonically diffeomorphic" is a much stronger property than simply being diffeomorphic, and can be a "one-way" relation.

References

 
  

Disproved conjectures
Hyperbolic geometry